Total Request Live (known commonly as TRL) is an Australian television program based on the American program of the same name broadcast on MTV that features popular music. It premiered in early April 2004 as a weekend show produced on a large cruising vessel known as The Pontoon, dubbed the "MTV Cruiser" which floated around Sydney Harbour containing the audience, performing bands and VJs. Australian band Killing Heidi were the first to perform on the show. After the summer months TRL Australia was broadcast from various venues around Sydney (including Home Nightclub and Coogee Beach Palace) before moving into a studio with a live audience. The show is now live on Tuesday to Thursday and then TRL Weekend on Friday, each day from 5pm to 6pm EST. The show was originally hosted by Kyle Sandilands, Maz Compton and Jason Dundas and simulcast on 2Day FM. Kyle withdrew from hosting duties during 2005, leaving the hosting of TRL Australia to  Maz Compton, Lyndsey Rodrigues, Nathan Sapsford and Jason Robert Dundas.

The show was largely Directed by Craig Tinetti in 2004 then Jakub Jacko in 2005, 2006 & 2019.
Production of TRL Australia ceased during 2006 without any announcement. Other locally produced shows such as Full Tank and The Lair replaced TRL.

On 27 August 2018, MTV Australia announced that TRL would be making a return in 2019. Radio hosts Ash London and Angus O'Loughlin, along with DJ Flex Mami and MTV editor Lisa Hamilton were announced as the revival's presenters on 4 February 2019. The first episode was broadcast on 8 March 2019.

See also

 List of Australian music television shows
MTV Australia
MTV Australia Video Music Awards
MuchMusic
Total Request Live
TRL Italy
TRL Poland

References

External links
Official MTV Australia Site
TRL Australia Site

Australian music television series
MTV original programming